The 1960 Tampa Spartans football team represented the University of Tampa in the 1960 NCAA College Division football season. It was the Spartans' 24th season. The team was led by head coach Marcelino Huerta, in his ninth year, and played their home games at Phillips Field in Tampa, Florida. They finished with a record of two wins, seven losses and one tie (2–7–1).

The Spartans then closed their season with three consecutive losses against  and Alabama on the road and at home against Appalachian State.

Schedule

References

Tampa
Tampa Spartans football seasons
Tampa Spartans football